Raisa Ivanovna Ryazanova (born 31 October 1944 in Petropavlovsk) is a Soviet and Russian theater and film actress. She has performed in more than sixty films since 1969. She won the State Prize of the USSR (1981) and was the People's Artist of Russia in 2005.

Selected filmography

References

External links

Soviet film actresses
Russian film actresses
People from Petropavl
1944 births
Living people
Russian television actresses
20th-century Russian actresses
21st-century Russian actresses
Honored Artists of the Russian Federation
People's Artists of Russia
Recipients of the USSR State Prize
Russian Academy of Theatre Arts alumni